Carpe Diem is the fifth full-length album by French power metal band Heavenly. It was released on 18 December 2009 via AFM Records.

Track listing

Personnel

Band members
 Benjamin Sotto – vocals
 Charley Corbiaux – guitar
 Matthieu Plana – bass
 Olivier Lapauze – guitar
 Pierre-Emmanuel Desfray – drums

Additional musicians
Oliver Hartmann – vocals on track 9
Geraldine Gadaut – female vocals, choirs
Nicolas Marco – orchestration, piano and keyboards

References 

2009 albums
Heavenly (French band) albums
AFM Records albums